On July 26, 2015, the Jazeera Palace Hotel in Mogadishu, Somalia was struck by a suicide bomber driving a vehicle packed with explosives. At least 15 people were killed. al-Shabab claimed responsibility for the attack.

Events
On July 10, 2015, Shabab had attacked two hotels and a stadium housing peacekeepers. The two hotels, Hotel Weheliye and Hotel Siyad, were targeted by car bombs.

The heavily guarded hotel was regarded as secure and favored by diplomats and high-ranking government officials.

The Jazeera Palace Hotel bombing by al Shabaab was endorsed by the Turkistan Islamic Party

References

Somali Civil War (2009–present)
Attacks on buildings and structures in 2015
Attacks on hotels in Africa
Mass murder in 2015
Terrorist incidents in Somalia in 2015
Al-Shabaab (militant group) attacks
July 2015 crimes in Africa
July 2015 events in Africa
21st century in Mogadishu
Building bombings in Somalia
Hotel bombings